The Migration Series, originally titled The Migration of the Negro, is a group of paintings by African-American painter Jacob Lawrence which depicts the migration of African Americans to the northern United States from the South that began in the 1910s.  It was published in 1941 and funded by the WPA.

Lawrence conceived of the series as a single work rather than individual paintings and worked on all of the paintings at the same time, in order to give them a unified feel and to keep the colors uniform between panels.  He wrote sentence-long captions for each of the sixty paintings explaining aspects of the event. Viewed in its entirety, the series creates a narrative in images and words that tells the story of the Great Migration.

Background 
Lawrence moved to Harlem when he was thirteen years old, having lived in New Jersey and Pennsylvania. His mother was born in Virginia and his father in South Carolina, so he would have been familiar with the migration from his own family members. Lawrence created the sixty paintings in the series in 1940–41 when he was twenty-three years old.  He did so with the help of funding from the Works Progress Administration, one of President Franklin D. Roosevelt's New Deal agencies.

The series is based on the Great Migration of African Americans from the rural south to the urban north that began in the 1910s. The early part of the migration ran through 1930 and numbered some 1.6 million people.  The panels depict the dire state of black life in the South, with poor wages, economic hardship due to the boll weevil, and a justice system rigged against them.  The North offered better wages and slightly more rights, although was not without its problems; living conditions were much more crowded in the cities, which led to new threats such as tuberculosis outbreaks. The final panel notes that the migration continues. Migrants were still moving north in the 1950s and 1960s.

The series was collected and exhibited in Washington D.C. in 1993 and retitled from "The Migration of the Negro" to "The Migration Series" and almost all of the captions were rewritten.  Notably, negro, a neutral term in 1941, had since fallen out of favor. Most of the new captions were shorter and use either "black" or "African-American".

Technique
The works consist of casein tempera paint applied to hardboard panels, atop a traditional gesso layer of rabbit-skin glue and whiting.  Lawrence made his own casein tempera, purchasing the dry pigments from Fedanzie Sperrle and using them unmixed so that the colors would not vary between panels.  With the panels laid out, he worked systematically to apply one color to each, starting with black and moving on to the lighter colors.

Lawrence was influenced by Mexican muralism of the 1920s–1940s, and The Migration Series is something of an American offshoot of the school.

Ownership
The sixty panels are shared between MoMA in New York and the Phillips Collection in Washington, DC, a split that happened in 1942.  Each has thirty panels, except when the collection is on loan (usually together).

See also 
Great Migration (African American)

References

Further reading 

African-American history between emancipation and the civil rights movement